The 13th International 500-Mile Sweepstakes Race was held at the Indianapolis Motor Speedway on Saturday, May 30, 1925.

Race winner Peter DePaolo became the first driver to complete the 500 miles in under five hours, and have an average over 100 mph. Norman Batten drove 21 laps of relief (laps 106-127) while DePaolo had his hands bandaged due to blisters and bruises.

Time trials
Four-lap (10 mile) qualifying runs were utilized. Leon Duray won the pole position with a 4-lap track record of 113.196 mph. Peter DePaolo, who qualified second, set the 1-lap track record at 114.285 mph.

Race summary and results

DePaolo jumped into the lead at the start, with Earl Cooper close behind. Phil Shafer led briefly, but DePaolo returned to the lead by half-distance. On lap 106, DePaolo came in for relief from Norman Batten while his bloody, blistered hands were bandaged. Dave Lewis then took over the lead in a front-wheel-drive Miller. The front wheels providing good grip in the turns, Lewis began to pull away. Batten soon pitted and DePaolo returned to the cockpit, and set his sights on Lewis.

At about 400 miles, Lewis began to slow, physically exhausted from the grind over the bricks. His crew called him in, but he overshot his pit stall and had to continue for another lap. When he finally stopped, crewmen lifted him out and Bennett Hill climbed in, now 1 1/2 laps behind DePaolo after the botched pit entry and eventual stop.

Hill sped after DePaolo, unlapping himself with about 25 laps to go and gaining several seconds with each lap. But DePaolo crossed the finish line with a record sub-5-hour 500 57 seconds ahead of Hill.

Race details

For 1925, riding mechanics were optional, however, no teams utilized them.
First alternate: none
Ralph DePalma would be the only driver in the race who had competed in the first Indy 500 in 1911.
Though Pete DePaolo is widely recognized as the first driver to complete (and win) the Indianapolis 500 in under five hours (over 100 mph average speed), he was not eligible for the prestigious Champion Spark Plug 100 mph Club founded in 1935. Since DePaolo briefly received relief help from Norman Batten during the race, DePaolo failed the strict criteria for the club. He never managed to complete the full 500 miles again, and accomplish the feat solo.
The race marked the first appearance of a front-wheel-drive car. Harry Miller built the car on the suggestion of driver Jimmy Murphy, who thought the concept would be quick on Indy's bricks while having less tire wear. The "Junior 8", without a driveshaft to the rear wheels, was only 36 inches tall, and a flyweight sub-1500 lbs. It showed its effectiveness and began a wave of front-drive cars for the next quarter-century. Murphy never got to drive it; he was killed in a crash at Syracuse the previous September. Miller hired Dave Lewis for the 500.

Gallery

References

Indianapolis 500 races
Indianapolis 500
Indianapolis 500
Indianapolis 500
Indianapolis 500